In mathematics, especially measure theory, a set function is a function whose domain is a family of subsets of some given set and that (usually) takes its values in the extended real number line  which consists of the real numbers  and 

A set function generally aims to  subsets in some way. Measures are typical examples of "measuring" set functions. Therefore, the term "set function" is often used for avoiding confusion between the mathematical meaning of "measure" and its common language meaning.

Definitions

The domain is a set function may have any number properties; the commonly encountered properties and categories of families are listed in the table below.

This article will henceforth assume this; although alternatively, all definitions below could instead be qualified by statements such as "whenever the sum/series is defined". This is sometimes done with subtraction, such as with the following result, which holds whenever  is finitely additive: 
:  is defined with  satisfying  and  

Null sets

Whenever  is not identically equal to either  or  then it is typically also assumed that:
:  if 

Variation and mass

The   is

where  denotes the absolute value (or more generally, it denotes the norm or seminorm if  is vector-valued in a (semi)normed space). 

Every finite set function must have a finite mass.

Common properties of set functions

 if it is valued in 
 if  for all pairwise disjoint finite sequences  such that 
 If  is closed under binary unions then  is finitely additive if and only if  for all disjoint pairs 
 If  is finitely additive and if  then taking  shows that  which is only possible if  or  where in the latter case,  for every  (so only the case  is useful).
 or  if in addition to being finitely additive, for all pairwise disjoint sequences  in  such that  all of the following hold:
 The series on the left hand side is defined in the usual way as the limit 
 As a consequence, if  is any permutation/bijection then  this is because  and applying this condition (a) twice guarantees that both  and  hold. By definition, a convergent series with this property is said to be unconditionally convergent. Stated in plain English, this means that rearranging/relabeling the sets  to the new order  does not affect the sum of their measures. This is desirable since just as the union  does not depend on the order of these sets, the same should be true of the sums  and 
if  is not infinite then this series  must also converge absolutely, which by definition means that  must be finite. This is automatically true if  is non-negative (or even just valued in the extended real numbers).
 As with any convergent series of real numbers, by the Riemann series theorem, the series  converges absolutely if and only if its sum does not depend on the order of its terms (a property known as unconditional convergence). Since unconditional convergence is guaranteed by (a) above, this condition is automatically true if  is valued in 
if  is infinite then it is also required that the value of at least one of the series  be finite (so that the sum of their values is well-defined). This is automatically true if  is non-negative.
a  if it is non-negative, countably additive (including finitely additive), and has a null empty set.
a  if it is a pre-measure whose domain is a σ-algebra. That is to say, a measure is a non-negative countably additive set function on a σ-algebra that has a null empty set.
a  if it is a measure that has a mass of 
an  if it is non-negative, countably subadditive, has a null empty set, and has the power set  as its domain.
 Outer measures appear in the Carathéodory's extension theorem and they are often restricted to Carathéodory measurable subsets
 Unlike many other properties, completeness places requirements on the set  (and not just on 's values).
 if there exists a sequence  in  such that  is finite for every index  and also 
 if there exists a subfamily  of pairwise disjoint sets such that  is finite for every  and also  (where ).
 Every -finite set function is decomposable although not conversely.
a  if it is a countably additive set function  valued in a topological vector space  (such as a normed space) whose domain is a σ-algebra.
 If  is valued in a normed space  then it is countably additive if and only if for any pairwise disjoint sequence  in   If  is finitely additive and valued in a Banach space then it is countably additive if and only if for any pairwise disjoint sequence  in  
a  if it is a countably additive complex-valued set function  whose domain is a σ-algebra.
 By definition, a complex measure never takes  as a value and so has a null empty set.
a  if it is a measure-valued random element.

Arbitrary sums

As described in this article's section on generalized series, for any family  of real numbers indexed by an arbitrary indexing set  it is possible to define their sum  as the limit of the net of finite partial sums  where the domain  is directed by  
Whenever this net converges then its limit is denoted by the symbols  while if this net instead diverges to  then this may be indicated by writing  
Any sum over the empty set is defined to be zero; that is, if  then  by definition.

For example, if  for every  then  
And it can be shown that  
If  then the generalized series  converges in  if and only if  converges unconditionally (or equivalently, converges absolutely) in the usual sense. 
Said differently, if  is uncountable then the generalized series  does not converge. 

In summary, due to the nature of the real numbers and its topology, every generalized series of real numbers (indexed by an arbitrary set) that converges can be reduced to an ordinary absolutely convergent series of countably many real numbers. So in the context of measure theory, there is little benefit gained by considering uncountably many sets and generalized series.

Inner measures, outer measures, and other properties

A set function  is said to be/satisfies
 if  whenever  satisfy 
 if it satisfies the following condition, known as :  for all  such that 
 Every finitely additive function on a field of sets is modular.
This geometric definition of "valuation" should not be confused with the stronger non-equivalent measure theoretic definition of "valuation" that is given below.
 if  for all  such that 
 if  for all finite sequences  that satisfy 
 or  if  for all sequences  in  that satisfy 
 If  is closed under finite unions then this condition holds if and only if  for all  If  is non-negative then the absolute values may be removed.
 If  is a measure then this condition holds if and only if  for all  in  If  is a probability measure then this inequality is Boole's inequality.
 if  whenever  are disjoint with 
 Lebesgue measure  is continuous from above but it would not be if the assumption that all  are eventually finite was omitted from the definition, as this example shows: For every integer  let  be the open interval  so that  where 
 if  for all  of sets  in  such that 
 if whenever  satisfies  then for every real  there exists some  such that  and 
an  if  is non-negative, countably subadditive, has a null empty set, and has the power set  as its domain.
 if every measurable set of positive measure contains an atom.

If a binary operation  is defined, then a set function  is said to be
 if  for all  and  such that

Topology related definitions

If  is a topology on  then a set function  is said to be:
a  if it is a measure defined on the σ-algebra of all Borel sets, which is the smallest σ-algebra containing all open subsets (that is, containing ).
a  if it is a measure defined on the σ-algebra of all Baire sets.
 if for every point  there exists some neighborhood  of this point such that  is finite.
 If  is a finitely additive, monotone, and locally finite then  is necessarily finite for every compact measurable subset 
  is directed with respect to  if and only if it is not empty and for all  there exists some  such that  and 
 or  if for every  
 if for every  
 if it is both inner regular and outer regular.
a  if it is a Borel measure that is also .
a  if it is a regular and locally finite measure.
 if every non-empty open subset has (strictly) positive measure.
a  if it is non-negative, monotone, modular, has a null empty set, and has domain

Relationships between set functions

Examples

Examples of set functions include:
 The function  assigning densities to sufficiently well-behaved subsets  is a set function.
 A probability measure assigns a probability to each set in a σ-algebra.
 A possibility measure assigns a number between zero and one to each set in the powerset of some given set. See possibility theory.
 A  is a set-valued random variable. See the article random compact set.

Lebesgue measure

Its definition begins with the set  of all intervals of real numbers, which is a semialgebra on  
The function that assigns to every interval  its  is a finitely additive set function (explicitly, if  has endpoints  then ). 
 
Lebesgue outer measure is not countably additive (and so is not a measure) although its restriction to the -algebra of all subsets  that satisfy the Carathéodory criterion:

is a measure that called Lebesgue measure. 
Vitali sets are examples of non-measurable sets of real numbers.

Infinite-dimensional space

As detailed in the article on infinite-dimensional Lebesgue measure, the only locally finite and translation-invariant Borel measure on an infinite-dimensional separable normed space is the trivial measure. However, it is possible to define Gaussian measures on infinite-dimensional topological vector spaces. The structure theorem for Gaussian measures shows that the abstract Wiener space construction is essentially the only way to obtain a strictly positive Gaussian measure on a separable Banach space.

Finitely additive translation-invariant set functions

However, if countable additivity is weakened to finite additivity then a non-trivial set function with these properties does exist and moreover, some are even valued in  In fact, such non-trivial set functions will exist even if  is replaced by any other abelian group

Extending set functions

Extending from semialgebras to algebras

which is the algebra on  generated by  
The archetypal example of a semialgebra that is not also an algebra is the family

on  where  for all  Importantly, the two non-strict inequalities  in  cannot be replaced with strict inequalities  since semialgebras must contain the whole underlying set  that is,  is a requirement of semialgebras (as is ).

If  is finitely additive then it has a unique extension to a set function  on  defined by sending  (where  indicates that these  are pairwise disjoint) to:
 
This extension  will also be finitely additive: for any pairwise disjoint  
 

If in addition  is extended real-valued and monotone (which, in particular, will be the case if  is non-negative) then  will be monotone and finitely subadditive: for any  such that

Extending from rings to σ-algebras

If  is a pre-measure on a ring of sets (such as an algebra of sets)  over  then  has an extension to a measure  on the σ-algebra  generated by  If  is σ-finite then this extension is unique.

 
and then restrict it to the set  of -measurable sets (that is, Carathéodory-measurable sets), which is the set of all  such that 

Restricting outer measures

If  is an outer measure on a set  where (by definition) the domain is necessarily the power set   of  then a subset  is called  or  if it satisfies the following : 

where  is the complement of  

The family of all –measurable subsets is a σ-algebra and the restriction of the outer measure  to this family is a measure.

See also

Notes

Proofs

References

  
  
  A. N. Kolmogorov and S. V. Fomin (1975), Introductory Real Analysis, Dover.

Further reading

 
 Regular set function at Encyclopedia of Mathematics

Basic concepts in set theory
Functions and mappings
Measure theory
Measures (measure theory)